Jeff Schroeder (born June 5, 1978) is an American television and online talk show host, currently for Daily Blast Live, a daily entertainment and news program produced and distributed by Tegna Inc., which is seen on-air on local stations across the U.S., and online (Facebook and YouTube) and across social media. Schroeder is also a former two-time contestant on Big Brother, racer on The Amazing Race, and resident on Marriage Boot Camp. He also starred in the 2016 TV movie Wish for Christmas alongside Joey Lawrence, Leigh-Allyn Baker, and Bill Engvall.

Early life
Schroeder was born in Norridge, Illinois and is of German and Italian descent.

Reality television

Big Brother 11 
Schroeder had a close relationship with Jordan Lloyd, which led to a relationship outside the house. On Day 1, Jeff was placed in the Athletes Clique. When his clique won HoH the first week, he was guaranteed safety. Despite being a part of their team, Jeff was seen as distant from his teammates, and became good friends with Jordan and Braden, both of whom are on the popular clique. On Day 8, a series of homophobic comments made by Jeff during an argument with Russell after the first Power of Veto ceremony were edited out of the first Tuesday broadcast episode while the comments remained uncensored online. The comment caused much controversy outside of the house. On Day 13, Jeff was nominated alongside his ally Laura by Head of Household Ronnie. However, on Day 14, Jeff won the second Power of Veto of the season, and used it on himself. His good friend Jordan was named the replacement nominee, but survived the eviction. On Day 33, it was revealed that America had chosen Jeff to win the power of the Coup d'État, which would allow him to change the nominations just moments before the live eviction. On Day 40, he chose to exercise this power, taken Lydia and Russell off the block in favor of Jessie and Natalie. This led to Jesse's eviction. On Day 47, Jeff became the eighth Head of Household of the season, making it his second win of the year. On Day 49, he won his second Power of Veto, making it the second week in a row that the HoH won the Veto as well. The first person to do this was Jordan. On Day 55, Jeff was nominated alongside Michele by Head of Household Kevin. When Michele won the Veto, Jordan was named her replacement nominee. On Day 61, Jeff was evicted by Kevin's tiebreaker vote after Natalie voted to evict Jeff and Michele voted to evict Jordan. On Day 73, he won the "America's Favorite" prize, awarding him $25,000. He was a part of the jury and voted for Jordan to win.

The Amazing Race 16 
After Big Brother, Jeff has made appearances on several other CBS shows. Jeff, along with Jordan, appeared on The Amazing Race 16. They came in seventh place.

Big Brother 12-13 
In 2010, Jeff, along with Jordan, entered the Big Brother 12 house to host the fifth Power of Veto competition, "Lover's Lane". Later in 2010, Jeff became a part of the online CBS show Around the World For Free. In 2011, Jeff and Jordan returned to Big Brother, this time as HouseGuest for Big Brother 13. Their appearance was due to the "Dynamic Duos" twist, which saw three pairs from past seasons enter the House against eight new HouseGuests. Jeff was ultimately evicted during a Double Eviction on Day 55, earning seventh place.

Online hosting 

Beginning Big Brother 14, Schroeder began hosting the online Big Brother recap show, Big Brother Live Chat, where he would interview house-guests after their evictions. The following season, he also began interviewing the house-guests before they entered the house.

In 2014, following the exit of Parvati Shallow from the program, Schroeder took over as host of Survivor Live, a recap show similar to Big Brother Live Chat where Schroeder interviews the castaways the day following the episode in which they are voted off. His first season hosting the show is for Survivor: San Juan del Sur.

Personal life
Jeff and his wife Jordan Lloyd currently own a YouTube channel with over 48,001 subscribers. They have two sons together named Layton and Lawson.

References 

1978 births
Living people
People from Norridge, Illinois
Big Brother (American TV series) contestants
The Amazing Race (American TV series) contestants